Miraslan (also Romanized as Mīrāṣlān) is a village in Rak Rural District, in the Central District of Kohgiluyeh County, Kohgiluyeh and Boyer-Ahmad Province, Iran. At the 2006 census, its population was 43, in 10 families.

References 

Populated places in Kohgiluyeh County